Dallaway is a surname. Notable people with the surname include:

 Andrea Dallaway (born 1970), British canoer
 James Dallaway (1763–1864), British antiquary, topographer, and writer

See also
 Mrs Dalloway, novel by Virginia Woolf
 Dillaway, surname
 Dilloway, surname